Lincoln School, Providence RI, is a college preparatory school offering advanced education in small classes to girls from Kindergarten through Grade 12, with a co-educational Little School (6 weeks to Pre-K).

History

Founded in 1884, by Mrs. William Ames in order for her daughter Margarethe Dwight to go to a real school, Lincoln School was named in honor of John Larkin Lincoln in 1888, a Brown University professor with a strong commitment to the education of girls and young women. Lincoln moved to its present site on Butler Avenue in 1913, expanding its campus and physical plant in the ensuing years to accommodate the School's growing N-12 program, the Little School and arts and athletic programs. In 1924, Lincoln School became a Quaker School and is an active member of the Friends Council on Education. In 1980, Lincoln acquired Faxon Farm in Rehoboth, MA, named in honor of alumna, Connie Briggs Faxon '36, to support the School's growing interscholastic sports program.

In 2018, Lincoln School completed construction on STEAM Hub, a modern two-story glass building on Blackstone Boulevard designed by LLB Architects (Lerner Ladds Bartels) at a cost of $5 million. The building is Lincoln's new home for science, technology, engineering, and math, art and architecture.

Notable alumnae 
 Glenna Collett-Vare
 Jill Craybas 
 Christine C. Ferguson
 Louise Herreshoff
 Jane Kramer
 Harriet Metcalf
 Dee Ocleppo
 Edith Pearlman 
 Amy Van Nostrand
 Meredith Vieira

References

External links
Official website

Quaker schools in Rhode Island
Private middle schools in Rhode Island
Private high schools in Rhode Island
Educational institutions established in 1884
Girls' schools in Rhode Island
High schools in Providence, Rhode Island
Private elementary schools in Rhode Island
Preparatory schools in Rhode Island
1884 establishments in Rhode Island